Cartago may refer to:
 Cartago, Valle del Cauca, Colombia
 Cartago Province, Costa Rica
 Cartago, Costa Rica, capital of the province of Cartago
 Cartago, California, United States

See also
 Carthage (disambiguation) in Latin and related languages
 Carthago or Charthage, Phoenician colony